Dance Jodi Dance is an Indian Tamil-language dance competition reality television show broadcast on Zee Tamil and from the year 2016 and also available to watch on digital platform ZEE5. The show was being judge by actress Sneha for all the seasons. The show was premiered on 17 September 2016.

Seasons overview

Season 1
Season 1 was premiered on 17 September 2016. The Show is hosted by Deepak Dinkar while Actress Sneha, Gautami and Accomplished Bharatanatyam dancer Sudha Chandran are the judges of the show. 

The Grand finale event was held at Nehru stadium chennai on 27 January 2017. The  winners are listed below 

 Title Winners of Dance Jodi Dance 1:0 : Meesha and Jeevan
 1st Runner-up : Yuthan and Nancy
 2rd Runner-up : Raaghav and Reshma
 3rd Runner-up : Priyanka and Arun
 Finalist : Myna Nandhini and Yogesh

Contestants
A Tamil celebrities, mostly TV actors are paired with new dancers handpicked through auditions will go head to head in their quest to be best performers.

Season 2

The second season aired on every Saturday and Sunday at 20:00 from 2 December 2017 to 26 May 2018 and ended with 49 Episodes. Actress Sneha has officially once again been appointed as the judge with new judge Gautami and Priyamani. Deepak Dinkar as the hosts. The season title winner is Ruth and Rinish Raj. 

 Title Winners of Dance Jodi Dance 2:0 : Ruth & Rinish Raj (₹5,00,000)
 1st Runner-up : Krishnamoorthy & Raveena (₹3,30,000)
 2rd Runner-up : Deva & Deeshika (₹2,25,000)
 3rd Runner-up : Kaali & Meghna Vincent

Contestants
A total of twelve celebrities, mostly TV actors, are paired with dancers handpicked through auditions and will go head to head in their quest to be best performers.

Season 3
The third season aired on every Saturday and Sunday at 18:30 from 2 December 2017 and which has been halted due to COVID-19 pandemic situation on 29 March 2020 with 41 episodes. Sneha, Priya Raman, Pooja and Namitha as the judges, Deepak Dinkar, Pearle Maaney and Anjana Rangan as the hosts.

Contestants

Season 4 (Dance Jodi Dance Reloaded)
Dance Jodi Dance Reloaded, it was premiered on 30 July 2022. The show was hosted by RJ Vijay while Actress Sneha, Sangeetha and Choreographer Baba Bhaskar are the judges of the show. 

 Title Winners of Dance Jodi Dance Reloaded : Vaishnavi & Avinash (₹5,00,000)
 1st Runner-up : Dominic & Preetha (₹3,00,000)
 2rd Runner-up : Kenny & Niharika (₹2,00,000)

Contestants

COVID-19 outbreak in India
Dance Jodi Dance 3.0, the third season of the show was premiered on 16 November 2019, which has been halted due to COVID-19 pandemic situation on 29 March 2020 with 41 episodes. Later the channel decided to launch the third season again with the revamp as Dance Jodi Dance Reloaded with different contestants on 2022.

References

External links 
 Dance Jodi Dance (season 1) on ZEE5
 Dance Jodi Dance (season 2) on ZEE5
 Dance Jodi Dance (season 3) on ZEE5
 Dance Jodi Dance Reloaded on ZEE5
 

Zee Tamil original programming
2016 Tamil-language television series debuts
Tamil-language dance television shows
Tamil-language reality television series
Tamil-language television shows
Television shows set in Tamil Nadu
2017 Tamil-language television seasons
2020 Tamil-language television seasons
2022 Tamil-language television seasons